Graham Taylor (born 19 March 1998) is a Scottish footballer, who plays as a midfielder for Lowland Football League club Berwick Rangers.

Taylor started his career with Dundee United, making his debut for them in November 2016. He had a short spell on loan with Edinburgh City, which became permanent in June 2018 following his release from Dundee United. He then signed for Cowdenbeath in 2019 before joining Berwick in 2021.

Playing career

Dundee United
Taylor signed his first professional contract with Dundee United in 2015, having been part of their youth academy for seven years. He had travelled daily from his home in Stirling to attend the club's development programme based at St John's Roman Catholic High School in Dundee.

Taylor's performances at development team level led to his inclusion in the first team squad for Scottish Challenge Cup matches during the 2016-17 season. After being an unused substitute against Peterhead, he made his debut as a substitute against Dunfermline Athletic on 12 November 2016. During the early part of the 2017–18 season, Taylor appeared in a number of further cup fixtures, and was named man of the match against Linfield in the Challenge Cup in October 2017.

In January 2018, Dundee United sent Taylor to League Two club Edinburgh City on a development loan for the rest of the season. Dundee United announced on 26 April 2018 that Taylor was one of four players who would be leaving the club, having not been offered a new contract.

Edinburgh City
In June 2018, Taylor was signed by Edinburgh City on a permanent basis.

Cowdenbeath
On 12 July 2019, Taylor signed for Cowdenbeath.

Berwick Rangers 
Taylor signed with Lowland League club Berwick Rangers in the summer of 2021.

Career statistics

References

External links

Living people
1998 births
Footballers from Stirling
Scottish footballers
Association football midfielders
Dundee United F.C. players
F.C. Edinburgh players
Cowdenbeath F.C. players
Scottish Professional Football League players
Berwick Rangers F.C. players
Lowland Football League players